Khnov is a rural locality (a selo) in Akhtynsky District, Republic of Dagestan, Russia. The population was 2,059 as of 2010.

Geography
Khnov is located 34 km southwest of Akhty (the district's administrative centre) by road. Gdym is the nearest rural locality.

See also
 Khnov bilingual epitaph

References 

Rural localities in Akhtynsky District